

Events

Pre-1600
1096 – A Seljuk Turkish army successfully fights off the People's Crusade.
1097 – First Crusade: Crusaders led by Godfrey of Bouillon, Bohemund of Taranto, and Raymond IV, Count of Toulouse, begin the Siege of Antioch.
1392 – Japanese Emperor Go-Kameyama abdicates in favor of rival claimant Go-Komatsu.
1512 – Martin Luther joins the theological faculty of the University of Wittenberg.
  1520   – João Álvares Fagundes discovers the islands of Saint Pierre and Miquelon, bestowing them their original name of "Islands of the 11,000 Virgins".
1600 – Tokugawa Ieyasu defeats the leaders of rival Japanese clans in the Battle of Sekigahara and becomes shōgun of Japan.

1601–1900
1774 – The flag of Taunton, Massachusetts is the first to include the word "Liberty".
1797 – In Boston Harbor, the 44-gun United States Navy frigate  is launched.
1805 – Napoleonic Wars: A British fleet led by Lord Nelson defeats a combined French and Spanish fleet under Admiral Villeneuve in the Battle of Trafalgar.
1824 – Portland cement is patented.
1854 – Florence Nightingale and a staff of 38 nurses are sent to the Crimean War.
1861 – American Civil War: Union forces under Colonel Edward Baker are defeated by Confederate troops in the second major battle of the war. 
1867 – The Medicine Lodge Treaty is signed by southern Great Plains Indian leaders. The treaty requires Native American Plains tribes to relocate to a reservation in the western Indian Territory.
1879 – Thomas Edison applies for a patent for his design for an incandescent light bulb. 
1888 – The Swiss Social Democratic Party is founded.
1892 – Opening ceremonies for the World's Columbian Exposition are held in Chicago, though because construction was behind schedule, the exposition did not open until May 1, 1893.
1895 – The Republic of Formosa collapses as Japanese forces invade.

1901–present
1907 – The 1907 Qaratog earthquake hits the borders of Uzbekistan and Tajikistan, killing between 12,000 and 15,000 people.
1910 –  arrives in Halifax Harbour to become the first ship of the Royal Canadian Navy.
1912 – First Balkan War: The Greek navy completes the capture of the island of Lemnos for use as a forward base against the Dardanelles.
1921 – President Warren G. Harding delivers the first speech by a sitting U.S. president against lynching in the Deep South.
1931 – A secret society in the Imperial Japanese Army launches an abortive coup d'état attempt.
1940 – The first edition of the Ernest Hemingway novel For Whom the Bell Tolls is published.
1943 – World War II: The Provisional Government of Free India is formally established in Japanese-occupied Singapore.
1944 – World War II: The first kamikaze attack damages  as the Battle of Leyte Gulf begins.
  1944   – World War II: The Nemmersdorf massacre against German civilians takes place.
  1944   – World War II: The city of Aachen falls to American forces after three weeks of fighting, the first German city to fall to the Allies.
1945 – In the 1945 French legislative election French women vote for the first time. 
1950 – Korean War: Heavy fighting begins between British and Australian forces and North Koreans during the Battle of Yongju.
1956 – The Mau Mau Uprising in Kenya is defeated.
1959 – In New York City, the Solomon R. Guggenheim Museum opens to the public.
  1959   – President Dwight D. Eisenhower approves the transfer of all US Army space-related activities to NASA, including most of the Army Ballistic Missile Agency.
1965 – Comet Ikeya–Seki approaches perihelion, passing 450,000 kilometers (279,617 miles) from the sun.
1966 – A colliery spoil tip slips onto houses and a school in the village of Aberfan in Wales, killing 144 people, 116 of whom were schoolchildren.
1967 – The National Mobilization Committee to End the War in Vietnam organizes a march of fifty thousand people from the Lincoln Memorial to the Pentagon.
1969 – The 1969 Somali coup d'état establishes a Marxist–Leninist administration.
1971 – A gas explosion kills 22 people at a shopping centre near Glasgow, Scotland.
1973 – Fred Dryer of the Los Angeles Rams becomes the first player in NFL history to score two safeties in the same game.
1978 – Australian civilian pilot Frederick Valentich vanishes over the Bass Strait south of Melbourne, after reporting contact with an unidentified aircraft.
1979 – Moshe Dayan resigns from the Israeli government because of strong disagreements with Prime Minister Menachem Begin over policy towards the Arabs.
1981 – Andreas Papandreou becomes Prime Minister of Greece, ending an almost 50-year-long system of power dominated by conservative forces.
1983 – The metre is defined as the distance light travels in a vacuum in 1/299,792,458 of a second.
1984 – Niki Lauda claims his third and final Formula One Drivers' Championship Title by half a point ahead of McLaren team-mate Alain Prost at the Portuguese Grand Prix.
1986 – In Lebanon, pro-Iran kidnappers claim to have abducted American writer Edward Tracy (he is released in August 1991).
1987 – The Jaffna hospital massacre is carried out by Indian peacekeeping forces in Sri Lanka, killing 70 Tamil patients, doctors and nurses.
1989 – In Honduras, 131 people are killed when a Boeing 727 crashes on approach to Toncontín International Airport near the nation's capital Tegucigalpa.
1994 – North Korea and the United States sign an Agreed Framework that requires North Korea to stop its nuclear weapons program and agree to inspections.
  1994 – In Seoul, South Korea, 32 people are killed when a span of the Seongsu Bridge collapses.
2005 – Images of the dwarf planet Eris are taken and subsequently used in documenting its discovery.
2011 – Iraq War: President Barack Obama announces that the withdrawal of United States troops from Iraq will be complete by the end of the year. 
2019 – Thirty people are killed in a fiery bus crash in western Democratic Republic of the Congo.
  2019   – In Canada, the 2019 Canadian federal election ends, resulting in incumbent Prime Minister Justin Trudeau remaining in office, albeit with the Liberal Party in a minority government.
2021 – A shooting occurs on the set of the film Rust, in which actor Alec Baldwin discharged a prop weapon which had been loaded, killing the director of photography, Halyna Hutchins, and injuring director Joel Souza.

Births

Pre-1600
1328 – Hongwu Emperor of China (d. 1398)
1409 – Alessandro Sforza, Italian condottiero (d. 1473)
1449 – George Plantagenet, 1st Duke of Clarence, Irish-English son of Cecily Neville, Duchess of York (d. 1478)
1527 – Louis I, Cardinal of Guise (d. 1578)
1536 – Joachim Ernest, Prince of Anhalt (d. 1586)
1581 – Domenichino, Italian painter (d. 1641)

1601–1900
1650 – Jean Bart, French admiral (d. 1702)
1658 – Henri de Boulainvilliers, French nobleman (d. 1722)
1675 – Emperor Higashiyama of Japan (d. 1710)
1687 – Nicolaus I Bernoulli, Swiss mathematician and theorist (d. 1759)
1712 – James Steuart, Scottish economist and author (d. 1780)
1725 – Franz Moritz von Lacy, Austrian field marshal (d. 1801)
1757 – Pierre Augereau, French general (d. 1816)
1762 – Herman Willem Daendels, Dutch general, lawyer, and politician, 36th Governor-General of the Dutch East Indies (d. 1818)
1772 – Samuel Taylor Coleridge, English poet, philosopher, and critic (d. 1834)
1775 – Giuseppe Baini, Italian priest, composer, and critic (d. 1844)
1790 – Alphonse de Lamartine, French poet and politician, French Head of State (d. 1869)
1809 – James Clark, American Jesuit (d. 1885)
1811 – Filippo Colini, Italian operatic baritone (d. 1863)
1821 – Sims Reeves, English tenor and actor (d. 1900)
1833 – Alfred Nobel, Swedish chemist and engineer, invented dynamite and founded the Nobel Prize (d. 1896)
1845 – Will Carleton, American poet and journalist (d. 1912)
1847 – Giuseppe Giacosa, Italian poet and playwright (d. 1906)
1851 – George Ulyett, English cricketer and footballer (d. 1898) 
1868 – Ernest Swinton, British Army officer (d. 1951)
1874 – Tan Kah Kee, Chinese businessman, community leader, communist and philanthropist (d. 1961)
1877 – Oswald Avery, Canadian-American physician and microbiologist (d. 1955)
1884 – Claire Waldoff, German singer and actress (d. 1957)
1886 – Eugene Burton Ely, American soldier and pilot (d. 1911)
1887 – Krishna Singh, Indian lawyer and politician, 1st Chief Minister of Bihar (d. 1961)
1894 – Edogawa Ranpo, Japanese author and critic (d. 1965)
1895 – Paavo Johansson, Finnish javelin thrower and decathlete (d. 1983)
  1895   – Edna Purviance, American actress (d. 1958)
1896 – Esther Shumiatcher-Hirschbein, Russian-Canadian poet and screenwriter (d. 1985)
1898 – Eduard Pütsep, Estonian wrestler and actor (d. 1960)
1900 – Andrée Boisson, French Olympic fencer (d. 1973)

1901–present
1902 – Eddy Hamel, American footballer (d. 1943)
1907 – Nikos Engonopoulos, Greek painter and poet (d. 1985)
1908 – Niyazi Berkes, Cypriot-English sociologist and academic (d. 1988)
1911 – Mary Blair, American illustrator and animator (d. 1978)
1912 – Don Byas, American saxophonist and educator (d. 1972)
  1912   – Alfredo Pián, Argentinian race car driver (d. 1990)
  1912   – Georg Solti, Hungarian-English conductor and director (d. 1997)
1914 – Martin Gardner, American mathematician and author (d. 2010)
1915 – Owen Bradley, American country music record producer (d. 1998)
1917 – Dizzy Gillespie, American trumpet player, composer, and bandleader (d. 1993)
1918 – Milton Himmelfarb, American sociologist and author (d. 2006)
  1918   – Albertina Sisulu, South African anti-apartheid activist (d. 2011)
1919 – Jim Wallwork, English-Canadian sergeant and pilot (d. 2013)
1921 – Malcolm Arnold, English composer (d. 2006)
  1921   – Bruce Beeby, Australian-English actor (d. 2013)
  1921   – Robert Clothier, Canadian actor (d. 1999) 
  1921   – Jim Shumate, American fiddler and composer (d. 2013)
  1921   – Ingrid van Houten-Groeneveld, Dutch astronomer and academic (d. 2015)
1922 – Liliane Bettencourt, French businesswoman and philanthropist (d. 2017)
1923 – Samuel Khachikian, Iranian director, screenwriter, and author (d. 2001)
1924 – Joyce Randolph, American actress
  1924   – Julie Wilson, American actress and singer (d. 2015)
1925 – Celia Cruz, Cuban-American singer (d. 2003)
  1925   – Virginia Zeani, Romanian soprano and educator
1926 – Bob Rosburg, American golfer (d. 2009)
  1926   – Leonard Rossiter, English actor (d. 1984)
1927 – Fritz Wintersteller, Austrian mountaineer (d. 2018)
  1927   – Howard Zieff, American director and photographer (d. 2009)
1928 – Whitey Ford, American baseball player and coach (d. 2020)
  1928   – Eudóxia Maria Froehlich, Brazilian zoologist (d. 2015)
  1928   – Vern Mikkelsen, American basketball player and coach (d. 2013)
1929 – Pierre Bellemare, French radio and television host (d. 2018)
  1929   – Fritz Hollaus, Austrian footballer (d. 1994)
  1929   – Ursula K. Le Guin, American author and critic (d. 2018)
1930 – Ivan Silayev, Russian engineer and politician, 19th Prime Minister of Russia (d. 2023)
1931 – Shammi Kapoor, Indian actor and director (d. 2011)
  1931   – Jim Parks junior, English cricketer and manager
1932 – Pál Csernai, Hungarian footballer and manager (d. 2013)
1933 – Maureen Duffy, English author, poet, playwright and activist
  1933   – Francisco Gento, Spanish footballer and manager (d. 2022)
1935 – Derek Bell, Irish harp player, pianist, and songwriter (d. 2002)
  1935   – Mel Street, American country music singer-songwriter and guitarist (d. 1978)
1937 – Said Afandi al-Chirkawi, Russian spiritual leader and scholar (d. 2012)
  1937   – Hank Nelson, Australian historian and academic (d. 2012)
1938 – Carl Brewer, Canadian ice hockey player (d. 2001)
1940 – Geoffrey Boycott, English cricketer and sportscaster
  1940   – Frances FitzGerald, American journalist and author
  1940   – Rhoda Gemignani, American actress
  1940   – Manfred Mann, South African-English keyboard player and producer 
  1940   – Marita Petersen, Faroese educator and politician, Prime Minister of the Faroe Islands (d. 2001)
1941 – Steve Cropper, American guitarist, songwriter, producer, and actor 
1942 – Elvin Bishop, American singer-songwriter and guitarist
  1942   – Allan Grice, Australian race car driver and politician
  1942   – Lou Lamoriello, American ice hockey player, coach, and manager
  1942   – Judy Sheindlin, American judge and television host
  1942   – Christopher A. Sims, American economist and statistician, Nobel Prize laureate 
  1942   – John Stevens, Baron Stevens of Kirkwhelpington, English police officer and academic
1943 – Tariq Ali, Pakistani historian and author
  1943   – Ron Elliott, American singer-songwriter, guitarist, and composer 
1944 – Mandy Rice-Davies, English model and actress (d. 2014)
  1944   – Michael Tugendhat, English lawyer and judge
1945 – Nikita Mikhalkov, Russian filmmaker
  1945   – Michael White, English journalist
1946 – Jane Heal, English philosopher and academic
  1946   – Jim Hill, American football player and sportscaster
  1946   – Lux Interior, American singer-songwriter (d. 2009)
  1946   – Lee Loughnane, American singer-songwriter and trumpet player 
1948 – Shaye J. D. Cohen, American historian and academic
  1948   – Allen Henry Vigneron, American archbishop
1949 – Michel Brière, Canadian ice hockey player (d. 1971)
  1949   – Mike Keenan, Canadian ice hockey player and coach
  1949   – Benjamin Netanyahu, Israeli captain and politician, 9th Prime Minister of Israel
1950 – Ronald McNair, American physicist and astronaut (d. 1986)
  1950   – Leela Vernon, Belizean musician and cultural conservationist (d. 2017)
1952 – Patti Davis, American actress and author
  1952   – Allen Hoey, American poet and author
  1952   – Brent Mydland, German-American keyboard player (d. 1990)
1953 – Charlotte Caffey, American guitarist and songwriter
  1953   – Eric Faulkner, Scottish singer-songwriter and guitarist
  1953   – Keith Green, American singer-songwriter, pianist, and minister (d. 1982)
  1953   – Marc Johnson, American bassist, composer, and bandleader
  1953   – Peter Mandelson, English journalist and politician, Secretary of State for Northern Ireland
1954 – Brian Tobin, Canadian journalist and politician, 6th Premier of Newfoundland
1955 – Dick DeVos, American businessman
  1955   – Fred Hersch, American pianist and composer
  1955   – Rich Mullins, American singer-songwriter (d. 1997)
1956 – Carrie Fisher, American actress and screenwriter (d. 2016)
  1956   – Mike Tully, American pole vaulter
1957 – Julian Cope, English singer-songwriter
  1957   – Irene Edgar, Scottish lawn bowler
  1957   – Wolfgang Ketterle, German physicist and academic, Nobel Prize laureate
  1957   – Steve Lukather, American singer-songwriter, guitarist, and producer 
1958 – Andre Geim, Russian-English physicist and academic, Nobel Prize laureate
1959 – George Bell, Dominican baseball player
  1959   – Rose McDowall, Scottish singer-songwriter and guitarist 
  1959   – Andy Picheta, English director, producer, and screenwriter
  1959   – Kevin Sheedy, Welsh-Irish footballer and manager
  1959   – Ken Watanabe, Japanese actor and producer
1962 – David Campese, Australian rugby player and coach
1964 – Jon Carin, American singer-songwriter, guitarist, and producer 
1965 – Ion Andoni Goikoetxea, Spanish footballer and manager
  1965   – Horace Hogan, American wrestler
  1965   – Hisashi Imai, Japanese singer-songwriter and guitarist 
1966 – Phillip Price, Welsh golfer
  1966   – Igor Prins, Estonian footballer and manager
  1966   – Arne Sandstø, Norwegian footballer and manager
1967 – Georgi Dakov, Bulgarian high jumper (d. 1996)
  1967   – Paul Ince, English footballer and manager
  1967   – Gavin Lovegrove, New Zealand javelin thrower and graphic designer
1968 – Alexandros Alexandris, Greek footballer and manager
  1968   – Kerstin Andreae, German politician
1969 – Michael Hancock, Australian rugby league player
  1969   – Mo Lewis, American football player
1970 – Louis Koo, Hong Kong actor and singer
1971 – Hal Duncan, Scottish author and poet
  1971   – Damien Martyn, Australian cricketer
  1971   – Nick Oliveri, American singer-songwriter and bass player
  1971   – Conor O'Shea, Irish rugby player and coach
  1971   – Paul Telfer, Scottish footballer and coach
  1971   – Thomas Ulsrud, Norwegian curler
1972 – Matthew Friedberger, American singer-songwriter and guitarist 
  1972   – Orlando Thomas, American football player (d. 2014)
  1972   – Evhen Tsybulenko, Ukrainian scholar and academic
  1972   – Ashutosh Agashe, Indian businessman and cricketer
1973 – Lera Auerbach, Russian-American pianist and composer
  1973   – Charlie Lowell, American pianist and songwriter 
1974 – Costel Busuioc, Romanian tenor
1975 – Toby Hall, American baseball player
  1975   – Henrique Hilário, Portuguese footballer
1976 – Henrik Gustavsson, Swedish footballer
  1976   – Jeremy Miller, American actor and singer
  1976   – Lavinia Miloșovici, Romanian gymnast
  1976   – Josh Ritter, American singer-songwriter and guitarist
  1976   – Mélanie Turgeon, Canadian skier
1978 – Joey Harrington, American football player and sportscaster
  1978   – Henrik Klingenberg, Finnish singer and keyboard player 
1979 – Khalil Greene, American baseball player
  1979   – Gabe Gross, American baseball player
1980 – Kim Kardashian, American reality television personality, actress, model, businesswoman and socialite
  1980   – Brian Pittman, American bass player 
1981 – Martin Castrogiovanni, Argentinian-Italian rugby player
  1981   – Nemanja Vidić, Serbian footballer
1982 – Matt Dallas, American actor 
  1982   – Jim Henderson, American baseball player
  1982   – Antony Kay, English footballer
  1982   – Hari Kondabolu, American comedian, actor, and podcaster
  1982   – Ray Ventrone, American football player
  1982   – Lee Chong Wei, Malaysian badminton player
  1982   – James White, American basketball player
1983 – Casey Fien, American baseball player
  1983   – Zack Greinke, American baseball player
  1983   – Brent Hayden, Canadian swimmer
  1983   – Gonzalo Klusener, Argentinian footballer
  1983   – Andy Marte, Dominican baseball player (d. 2017)
  1983   – Amber Rose, American model
  1983   – Chris Sherrington, English-Scottish martial artist
  1983   – Ninet Tayeb, Israeli singer
  1983   – Shelden Williams, American basketball player
1984 – Anna Bogdanova, Russian heptathlete
  1984   – Tom Brandstater, American football player
  1984   – Kenny Cooper, American soccer player
  1984   – Anouk Leblanc-Boucher, Canadian speed skater
  1984   – José Lobatón, Venezuelan baseball player
  1984   – Marvin Mitchell, American football player
  1984   – Kieran Richardson, English footballer
1985 – Simone Bracalello, Italian footballer
  1985   – Dean Collis, Australian rugby league player
1986 – Almen Abdi, Swiss footballer
  1986   – Chibuzor Chilaka, Nigerian footballer
  1986   – Scott Rendell, English footballer
1987 – Justin De Fratus, American baseball player
  1987   – Andrey Grechin, Russian swimmer
1988 – Ricki Olsen, Danish footballer
  1988   – Daniel Schorn, Austrian cyclist
1989 – Mads Dahm, Norwegian footballer
  1989   – Luke Murphy, English footballer
  1989   – Jonathan Viera, Spanish footballer
  1989   – Sam Vokes, English-Welsh footballer
1990 – Bengali-Fodé Koita, French footballer
  1990   – Mathieu Peybernes, French footballer
  1990   – Ricky Rubio, Spanish basketball player
1991 – Tom Eastman, English footballer
  1991   – Geoffry Hairemans, Belgian footballer
  1991   – Rob Keogh, English cricketer
  1991   – Vadaine Oliver, English footballer
  1991   – Harry Pell, English footballer
1992 – Marzia Bisognin, Italian businessperson and former YouTuber
  1992   – Bernard Tomic, German-Australian tennis player
1993 – Kane Brown, American singer and songwriter
1995 – Cameron Burgess, Scottish-Australian footballer
  1995   – Antoinette Guedia Mouafo, Cameroonian swimmer
  1995   – Doja Cat, American rapper, singer and songwriter

Deaths

Pre-1600
 645 – Zhenzhu Khan, khan of Xueyantuo
1023 – Gero, Archbishop of Magdeburg
1096 – Walter Sans Avoir, a leader of the First Crusade
1125 – Cosmas of Prague, Bohemian priest and historian (b. 1045)
1204 – Robert de Beaumont, 4th Earl of Leicester, English politician
1221 – Alix, Duchess of Brittany (b. 1201)
1266 – Birger Jarl, Swedish politician (b. 1210)
1314 – Geoffrey de Geneville, 1st Baron Geneville
1422 – Charles VI of France (b. 1368)
1500 – Emperor Go-Tsuchimikado of Japan (b. 1442)
1505 – Paul Scriptoris, German mathematician and educator (b. 1460)
1556 – Pietro Aretino, Italian author (b. 1492)
1558 – Julius Caesar Scaliger, Italian physician and scholar (b. 1484)
1600 – Ōtani Yoshitsugu, Japanese samurai (b. 1558)

1601–1900
1623 – William Wade, English politician and diplomat, Lieutenant of the Tower of London (b. 1546)
1662 – Henry Lawes, English pianist and composer (b. 1595)
1687 – Edmund Waller, English poet and politician (b. 1606)
1765 – Giovanni Paolo Panini, Italian painter and architect (b. 1691)
1775 – Peyton Randolph, American lawyer and politician, 1st President of the Continental Congress (b. 1721)
1777 – Samuel Foote, English actor and playwright (b. 1720)
1805 – John Cooke, English captain (b. 1763)
  1805   – George Duff, Scottish captain (b. 1764)
  1805   – Horatio Nelson, 1st Viscount Nelson, English admiral (b. 1758)
1821 – Dorothea Ackermann, German actress (b. 1752)
1835 – Muthuswami Dikshitar, Indian poet and composer (b. 1775)
1861 – Edward Dickinson Baker, American congressman and colonel (b. 1811)
1872 – Jacques Babinet, French physicist, mathematician, and astronomer (b. 1794)
1873 – Johan Sebastian Welhaven, Norwegian author, poet, and critic (b. 1807)
1896 – James Henry Greathead, South African-English engineer (b. 1844)

1901–present
1903 – Jinmaku Kyūgorō, Japanese sumo wrestler, the 12th Yokozuna (b. 1829)
1904 – Isabelle Eberhardt, Swiss explorer and journalist (b. 1877)
1907 – Jules Chevalier, French priest, founded the Missionaries of the Sacred Heart (b. 1824)
1931 – Arthur Schnitzler, Austrian author and playwright (b. 1862)
1938 – Dorothy Hale, American actress (b. 1905)
1940 – William G. Conley, American journalist, lawyer, and politician, 18th Governor of West Virginia (b. 1866)
1941 – Alexander Greenlaw Hamilton, Australian biologist (b. 1852)
1944 – Alois Kayser, German-French missionary (b. 1877)
1952 – Hans Merensky, South African geologist and philanthropist (b. 1871)
1963 – Józef Franczak, Polish sergeant (b. 1918)
1965 – Bill Black, American bass player and bandleader (b. 1926)
1969 – Jack Kerouac, American novelist and poet (b. 1922)
  1969   – Wacław Sierpiński, Polish mathematician and academic (b. 1882)
1970 – Li Linsi, Chinese educator and diplomat (b. 1896)
1971 – Minnie Evans, American artist (b. 1888)
1973 – Nasif Estéfano, Argentinian race car driver (b. 1932)
1975 – Charles Reidpath, American runner and general (b. 1887)
1977 – Ferit Tüzün, Turkish composer (b. 1929)
1978 – Anastas Mikoyan, Armenian-Russian civil servant and politician (b. 1895)
1980 – Hans Asperger, Austrian physician and psychologist (b. 1906)
1982 – Radka Toneff, Norwegian singer-songwriter (b. 1952)
1983 – Joseph P. Lordi, American government official (b. 1919)
1984 – François Truffaut, French actor, director, producer, and screenwriter (b. 1932)
1985 – Dan White, American assassin and politician (b. 1946)
1986 – Lionel Murphy, Australian jurist and politician, 22nd Attorney-General of Australia (b. 1922)
1989 – Jean Image, Hungarian-French director, producer, and screenwriter (b. 1910)
1990 – Dany Chamoun, Lebanese engineer and politician (b. 1934)
  1990   – Prabhat Ranjan Sarkar, Indian spiritual guru, philosopher and author (b. 1921)
1991 – Lorenc Antoni, Albanian composer, conductor, and musicologist (b. 1909)
1992 – Ante Ciliga, Croatian politician, writer and publisher (b. 1898)
  1992   – Jim Garrison, American lawyer and judge (b. 1921)
1993 – Sam Zolotow, American journalist and critic (b. 1899)
1995 – Maxene Andrews, American singer (b. 1916)
  1995   – Jesús Blasco, Spanish author and illustrator (b. 1919)
  1995   – Nancy Graves, American sculptor and painter (b. 1939)
  1995   – Shannon Hoon, American singer-songwriter and guitarist (b. 1967)
1996 – Georgios Zoitakis, Greek general and politician (b. 1910)
1998 – Francis W. Sargent, American soldier and politician, 64th Governor of Massachusetts (b. 1915)
1999 – Lars Bo, Danish author and illustrator (b. 1924)
  1999   – Ahmet Taner Kışlalı, Turkish political scientist, lawyer, and politician (b. 1939)
2002 – Edward J. Mortola, American academic and president of Pace University (b. 1917)
2003 – Louise Day Hicks, American politician (b. 1916)
  2003   – Luis A. Ferré, Puerto Rican engineer and politician, 3rd Governor of Puerto Rico (b. 1904)
  2003   – Elliott Smith, American singer-songwriter and guitarist (b. 1969)
2006 – Sandy West, American singer-songwriter and drummer  (b. 1959)
2007 – Paul Fox, English singer-songwriter and guitarist (b. 1951)
2010 – A. Ayyappan, Indian poet and translator (b. 1949)
2011 – Hikmet Bilâ, Turkish journalist and author (b. 1954)
  2011   – Tone Pavček, Slovenian poet and author (b. 1928)
2012 – Yash Chopra, Indian director, producer, and screenwriter (b. 1932)
  2012   – Antoni Dobrowolski, Polish educator (b. 1904)
  2012   – Jaroslav Kozlík, Czech volleyball player and educator (b. 1907)
  2012   – Alf Kumalo, South African photographer and journalist (b. 1930)
  2012   – George McGovern, American historian, lieutenant, and politician (b. 1922)
2013 – Bud Adams, American businessman (b. 1923)
  2013   – Gianni Ferrio, Italian composer and conductor (b. 1924)
  2013   – Rune T. Kidde, Danish author, poet, and illustrator (b. 1957)
  2013   – Colonel Robert Morris, American singer-songwriter and drummer (b. 1954)
  2013   – Major Owens, American librarian and politician (b. 1936)
  2013   – Tony Summers, Welsh swimmer (b. 1924)
  2013   – Oscar Yanes, Venezuelan journalist and author (b. 1927)
2014 – Ben Bradlee, American journalist and author (b. 1921)
  2014   – Nelson Bunker Hunt, American businessman (b. 1926)
  2014   – Mohammad-Reza Mahdavi Kani, Iranian cleric and politician, Prime Minister of Iran (b. 1931)
  2014   – Edith Kawelohea McKinzie, Hawaiian genealogist, author, and hula expert (b. 1925)
  2014   – Gough Whitlam, Australian lieutenant, lawyer, and politician, 21st Prime Minister of Australia (b. 1916)
2015 – France Bučar, Slovenian lawyer and politician (b. 1923)
  2015   – Marty Ingels, American actor (b. 1936)
  2015   – Norman W. Moore, English conservationist and author (b. 1923)
  2015   – Sheldon Wolin, American philosopher, theorist, and academic (b. 1922)
2020 – Frank Bough, English television presenter (b. 1933)
2021 – Bernard Haitink, Dutch conductor and violinist (b. 1929)

Holidays and observances
Armed Forces Day (Honduras)
Christian feast day:
Asterius of Ostia
Berthold of Parma
Blessed Charles of Austria  (Roman Catholic Church)
Fintán of Taghmon
Hilarion
John of Bridlington
Laura of Saint Catherine of Siena
Leticia
Malchus of Syria
Peter Yu Tae-chol
Severinus of Bordeaux
 Tuda of Lindisfarne
Ursula
Viator of Lyons
October 21 (Eastern Orthodox liturgics)
Egyptian Naval Day (Egypt)
Indian Police Commemoration Day (India)
National Nurses' Day (Thailand)
Ndadaye Day (Burundi)
Overseas Chinese Day (Republic of China)
Trafalgar Day (the British Empire in the 19th and early 20th century)
Birth of the Báb (2017) (Baháʼí Faith)

References

External links

 
 
 

Days of the year
October